Sunga, or the Shunga Empire, was an Indian empire of the 2nd and 1st century BCE.

Sunga may also refer to:
 Sunga (caste), a Hindu caste from Rajasthan
 Sunga (swimsuit), a Brazilian style of swimwear
 Sunga, Bhopal, a village in Madhya Pradesh, India
 Pushyamitra Shunga, or Sunga (c. 185–149 BCE), founder of the Shunga Empire
 Lyal S. Sunga (21st century), human rights specialist

See also
 Shunga (disambiguation)